The interleukin-1 receptor antagonist protein (IL-1RN) is a protein that in humans is encoded by the IL1RN gene.

IL-1RN was initially called the IL-1 inhibitor and was discovered separately in 1984 by two independent laboratories. IL-1RN is an agent that binds non-productively to the cell surface interleukin-1 receptor (IL-1R), the same receptor that binds interleukin 1 family (IL-1), preventing IL-1's from sending a signal to that cell.

Function 

IL-1RA is a member of the interleukin 1 cytokine family. IL1Ra is secreted by various types of cells including immune cells, epithelial cells, and adipocytes, and is a natural inhibitor of the pro-inflammatory effect of IL1β. This protein inhibits the activities of interleukin 1, alpha (IL1A) and interleukin 1, beta (IL1B), and modulates a variety of interleukin 1 related immune and inflammatory responses. This gene and five other closely related cytokine genes form a gene cluster spanning approximately 400 kb on chromosome 2. Four alternatively spliced transcript variants encoding distinct isoforms have been reported.

Clinical significance 

A polymorphism of this gene is reported to be associated with increased risk of osteoporotic fractures and gastric cancer.

Mutations in the IL1RN gene results in a rare disease called deficiency of the interleukin-1–receptor antagonist (DIRA). Variants of the IL1RN gene is also associated with risk of schizophrenia.  Elevated levels of IL1RN has been found in serum of schizophrenia patients.

A recombinant, slightly modified version of interleukin 1 receptor antagonist called anakinra is used in the treatment of rheumatoid arthritis, an autoimmune disease in which IL-1 plays a key role. Anakinra differs from native human IL-1Ra in that it has the addition of a single methionine residue at its amino terminus

Use in horses
Interleukin 1 receptor antagonist is used in horses for the treatment of equine lameness secondary to joint and soft-tissue injury.

References

Further reading

External links
 

Cytokines